Kito & Reija Lee are an Australian electropop duo formed in 2009 in Perth, Western Australia. They are currently based in London, England.
Maaike Kito Lebbing & Reija Lee Thomas met as teenagers and began working together as the duo Kito & Reija Lee in September 2009. Their break out track, Sweet Talk, featured prominently in Victoria's Secret 2010 world-wide campaign, as well as reaching number one on the iTunes Dance Music charts. Their second EP, II, was released on 22 July 2014. 
The first single off the EP "II", Starting Line, debuted 18 March 2014. Earmilk hailed as it "a brand new project which mixes sparkling melodies with Reija's standout vocals, almost putting one under hypnosis on first listen." The second single off the EP "II", "WORD$" ft Zebra Katz was entered into full rotation on Triple J 1 August 2014.

Discography

Extended plays

Singles

Guest appearances

References

Australian pop music groups
Musical groups from Perth, Western Australia
Musical groups established in 2009
Musical groups disestablished in 2015
Australian musical duos
Electronic music duos
Pop music duos
Female musical duos
Australian electronic music groups